The Nolan Report may refer to : 

The Committee on Standards in Public Life, an advisory body of the UK government.
The Nolan Report, a committee to investigate clerical child abuse.